The German terms Bundeswappen ("Federal Coat of Arms") or Bundesadler ("Federal Eagle") may refer to:
 Coat of arms of Germany
 Coat of arms of Austria